Lenz is a novella fragment written by Georg Büchner in Strasbourg in 1836. It is based on the documentary evidence of Jean Frédéric Oberlin's diary. Jakob Michael Reinhold Lenz, a friend of Goethe, is the subject of the story. In March 1776 he met Goethe in Weimar. Later he suffered from mental disorder and was sent to Oberlin's vicarage in the Steintal. The story is concerned with this last incident. Although left unfinished at the time of Büchner's death in 1837, it has been seen as a precursor to literary modernism. Its influence on later writers has been immense.
The story has been adapted for the stage as Jakob Lenz, a 1978 chamber opera by Wolfgang Rihm.

Editions in English 

 Lenz. Translated by Michael Hamburger. West Newbury: Frontier Press, 1969.
 Woyzeck and Lenz. Translated by Hedwig Rappolt. New York: TSL Press, 1988.
 Lenz. Translated by Richard Sieburth. Brooklyn: Archipelago Books, 2005.  .
 Complete Works and Letters, pp. 139–162.  Translated by Henry J. Schmidt.  New York: Continuum, 1986.  .
 Complete Plays and Prose, pp. 139–166. Translated by Carl Richard Mueller. New York: Hill and Wang, 1963. .

Film Adaptation 

Alexandre Rockwell wrote, directed, produced and edited a feature-length adaptation of Lenz in 1982.  It was his debut film.

References 

 Sieburth, Richard. "Translator's Afterword" and "Notes", in the 2005 Archipelago edition.

External links
  (german)
 Richard Sieburth's English translation at Google Books.

German short stories
1836 short stories
Novels adapted into operas
Works by Georg Büchner